This is a list of superzoom compact cameras, sometimes also called as superzoom 'travel' compact cameras.

See also

 Point-and-shoot camera
 Digital single-lens reflex camera
 Camera phone

References